Ngawang Jamphel (born 27 September 1992) is a Bhutanese footballer who plays for Thimphu City FC and the Bhutan national football team.

Career

International
Jamphel made his senior international debut on 1 April 2018, coming on as a halftime substitute in a 7–0 friendly defeat to Malaysia. He was included in the Bhutan squad for the 2018 SAFF Championship, making the third-most saves in the tournament despite only playing two matches.

Career statistics

International

References

External links

Ngawang Jamphel at EuroSport

1992 births
Living people
Thimphu City F.C. players
Bhutanese footballers
Bhutan international footballers
Association football goalkeepers